Rayman Raving Rabbids is a 2006 party video game developed and published by Ubisoft. The game is a spinoff in the Rayman series. The game consists of 75 minigames. The game was released for the PlayStation 2, Wii, Xbox 360, and Microsoft Windows systems, with a different version released for Game Boy Advance, Nintendo DS and mobile phones. Versions for GameCube, Xbox, PlayStation 3, and PlayStation Portable were planned, but were later cancelled.

The game later spawned a subseries, with the first sequel, Rayman Raving Rabbids 2, being released in November 2007. As of April 2014, the series had sold over 14 million units worldwide.

Gameplay
The game features two different modes of play - 'Story mode' and 'Score mode'. In story mode the game follows fifteen days of Rayman's imprisonment by the Rabbids. Each day, Rayman must complete at least three trials, followed by one special "boss trial", such as a first-person rail shooter using plungers, or a racing game in which the player controls a warthog and uses a flyswatter as a riding crop. Completing trials earns Rayman various costumes and matching music, including Gangsta, Raymaninho (a portmanteau of the title character's name and football star Ronaldinho), Disco, Gothic, Caramba, Rock'n'Roll, Granny, DeeJay, and Bunny. Trial completion also earns plungers and after accumulating enough, Rayman builds a ladder up the edge of his jail cell and escapes to freedom. In Score mode, the player can repeat past trials in an attempt to improve their score or can play the game as a multiplayer party game.

Minigames
Minigames fall into one of four categories: Bunny Hunt, Sports, Challenges, and 'Shake your Booty!' dancing. Bunny Hunt comprises first-person rail shooter stages, all appearing in Story Mode as "boss" stages that the player may play for Score, Time, or Survival with the goal of obtaining the highest score possible with only one life. Two players can participate in Co-op Bunny Hunt, but Survival is not available for multiplayer. The Sports minigames can be played for Workout, which requires rapid movement of the Wii Remote, and Precision, which involves the controls of the remote. Sports minigames also include 'Get Going!' racing stages, including four warthog racing games and a skydiving race. Challenges are various games found in Score Mode which must be played one after the other with the goal of a high combined score in a Triathlon, Pentathlon, or Decathlon. The 'Shake your Booty!' category involves dance-themed minigames and are found in Story Mode each day. Also, there are "Skill" minigames that do not fall under any of the other categories. Variations of the mini-games are featured in the DS version. Games such as "Feed the bunnies", "Ghost hunt", "Bunny invasion", "Stop the mines" and "Super Rabbid" are used. The stylus is used for all of the minigames, unlike the rest of the gameplay.

Handheld versions

The Game Boy Advance and Nintendo DS versions of the game are, unlike their console counterparts, traditional platformers. In the Game Boy Advance version, the costumes that Rayman acquires give him special abilities, such as using the Granny outfit to sneak past cameras, or the DeeJay outfit to break open vents. The Nintendo DS version allows players to use the stylus to perform certain actions, such as controlling wind or setting rabbits on fire.

Plot

Characters

The Rabbids are the common enemy in this game. Their technology varies from advanced giant robots to close combat tools such as plungers and feather dusters. Characters do not have the voice acting that was first used in Rayman 2: The Great Escape. Instead, the voices become regular gibberish, except for a few words like "Hey" and "Wow", or "Daaaaaaaaaaaaaaah!" (in "Rayman Raving Rabbids Making of" they said "Action"). Besides the Rabbids, there are also warthogs, seen in the game's warthog races, and various other animals (such as sheep, cows and pigs). One of the minigames actually requires the player to point the members of the same species out.

Story
The game begins with a cut-scene showing Rayman having a picnic with the local Globox kids. Their picnic is interrupted when an earthquake erupts and the Globox kids sink into the ground while 3 Rabbids appear in their place. Their commander Sergueï kidnaps Rayman and throws him in an arena with angry Rabbids, several of whom are armed. Rayman must complete his first trials now, and afterwards Sergueï takes him to his cell and gives him a plunger. Initially the Rabbids jeer him, but as Rayman completes more trials, they grow bored, and eventually he even becomes popular among the Rabbids and they cheer him on, in addition to making his jail cell more hospitable. Eventually, Rayman amasses a collection of plungers as rewards for completing the trials. By building a ladder out of all his plungers to reach the window (and settling with an annoying bird who keeps defecating on him), Rayman manages to escape and free himself. Once liberated, he remembers the Globox kids and attempts to return through one of the Rabbid holes to rescue them, but winds up getting stuck in the hole. In a post-credits scene, Rayman is still stuck in the hole through the night, and sheep come to eat the leftovers of his picnic.

Development
The game began development in the Ubisoft Montpellier studio. The studio head Michel Ancel sketched an initial concept for a rabbit character, and from there, the idea of a mass invasion of bunnies grew. The team then began work on a traditional platform game, then tentatively titled Rayman 4. However, upon receiving development kits from Nintendo, the team began focusing on implementing a wide range of gameplay types. Another project called Rayman 4 was in development for next-generation consoles, with Michel Ancel being involved, unlike Rayman 3 where he was just a creative advisor. The game would have released on PS3, Xbox 360, Wii, and PC, but was cancelled by E3 2006 in favour of the Raving Rabbids spinoff series. When it became clear that these were not going to fit into a traditional platform game, Rayman Raving Rabbids was altered to become a game consisting of separated trials. The changes meant that some of the trials and concepts revealed before the game's release did not appear in the final game, such as hawk and tarantula riding. While Ancel was seen as one of the main figures behind the project before E3, he left the project after the revamp, and is only credited with character design in the final game. The PC version is made in Ubisoft's studio in Sofia. Rayman Raving Rabbids is also available for the Xbox 360, PlayStation 2, Wii, Game Boy Advance, PC, and Nintendo DS.

Original concept: Rayman 4
Two years after the release of Rayman 3: Hoodlum Havoc, Ubisoft had foreseen the development of the sequel: Rayman 4. The initial stages of development began in 2005, with totally different concepts and without the presence of the Rabbids, and were entrusted to the studios of Phoenix Interactive. The programmers created a considerable amount of concept-artworks, of which a good part was gradually revealed to the public in the following years. These artworks show that the game should have 3D features faithful to many environments of Rayman, such as the "Land of Music" and "Picture City", as well as a new presumed return of Bad Rayman. After four months of initial production, development of the game was canceled. It appears that the game was to be a reboot/retelling of the original Rayman game, and would have involved Rayman revisiting numerous locations from the original game recreated in 3D and to a high level of accuracy.

From the previous project a second development was started at the studio of Ubisoft Montpellier, the studio that developed the first three chapters of the series. In 2006, the second phase was again geared towards the development of a 3D platform game designed by Michel Ancel and known by the final title of Rayman Raving Rabbids. This new title, which Michel Ancel himself referred to as Rayman 4, was to be an adventure story in which Rayman teams up with his former enemy André from Rayman 3 to save the world by an army of Rabbids. In addition to the characters already appeared in previous titles, there were new ones, among which stand out an anonymous female one belonging to the same lineage as Rayman who served as damsel in distress, and a hedonistic emperor of the Rabbids.

Michel Ancel also stated that in the course of history the main purpose would have consisted also in saving, in addition to the aforementioned girl, André himself and the latter's girlfriend. Gameplay innovations included attacking enemies with punches and kicks, the ability to ride creatures such as giant hawks, tarantulas, sharks, and warthogs, and in an end-of-level minigame where you had to hypnotize the Rabbids by dancing to access new areas to play.

The project was supported for several months, until the developers received the Nintendo Wii development kit. With these tools, the developers experimented with further varieties of play styles and as a result the action and platform elements were removed and replaced by the final party-style version of Rayman Raving Rabbids, followed over time by new titles of the same kind.

However, the Game Boy Advance and Nintendo DS versions were not generally released as a party but as a side-scrolling platform game and very similar to the gameplay of the Game Boy Advance version of Rayman 3, and the storyline is a fusion of the first two projects.

In the book L'Histoire de Rayman, it was revealed that the Robo-Pirates and the Livingstones/Lividstones were planned to return in Rayman 4, also the evil counterpart Dark Rayman and even Mr. Dark were planned to return. There is also concept art of a young human girl named "Cielle" who was intended to appear in the game. It is unknown what her role was to be in the game or if she was intended to be playable.

In December 2022, most of the assets and levels used in the prototype were leaked by an anonymous user on Internet Archive including the original designs of the Rabbids, the rideable creatures, some of the cutscenes and the levels. However, when Rayman gets hit by the Rabbids, he loses his clothes for some reason.

Reception

The game has received varied reviews. IGN and GameSpot complimented the game's "sick sense of humor" and a heavy emphasis on fun, as well as the design of the bunnies and the game in general. Reviews highlighted the story, music and sound, and said that gameplay is addictive and optimized for the Wii. A few critics claimed that other developers of Wii launch titles had simply ported their games and "tacked on" Wii controls. It is one of the highest-selling third party games for the Wii. The game was subsequently released on other platforms, including the PC, PS2, and Xbox 360. Reviewers in general found these versions to play at an inferior level to the Wii version due to the game's controls having been optimized with the Wii in mind.

Several shortcomings were cited. Some of the minigames were described as "duds", being unenjoyable or broken; the game could not run in progressive scan mode (despite it being claimed in the manual); and not all of the trials had multiplayer opportunities, "reducing the game's potential as a party game." Nintendo Power stated that a lot of promised features had been cut out. The Wiire awarded this game with Family Friendly, Ease of Use, and Multiplayer Mayhem awards.

References

External links

 
 Rayman Raving Rabbids (J2ME) at MobyGames

2006 video games
Party video games
Rayman
Rabbids
Wii games
MacOS games
Ubisoft games
Windows games
Xbox 360 games
PlayStation 2 games
Jade (game engine) games
Cancelled GameCube games
Cancelled PlayStation 3 games
Cancelled PlayStation Portable games
Cancelled Xbox games
Wii games re-released on the Nintendo eShop
Video games about rabbits and hares
Video games scored by Jason Graves
Video games scored by Mark Griskey
Video games developed in France
Video games developed in Bulgaria